The 9th Asian Games were held from 19 November to 4 December 1982, in Delhi, India. 74 Asian and Asian Games records were broken at the event. This was also the first Asiad to be held under the aegis of the Olympic Council of Asia. Delhi joined Bangkok as the cities to host multiple editions of the Asian Games up to this point. Later, Jakarta and Doha would enter this group.

A total of 3,411 athletes from 33 National Olympic Committees (NOCs) participated in these games, competing in 196 events in 21 sports and 23 disciplines. The number of participating countries was the highest in Asian Games history. Handball, equestrian, rowing and golf were included for the first time; fencing and bowling were excluded.

Highlights
These Asian Games  saw the beginning of Chinese dominance in the medals tally.

Japan had won the maximum number of medals in previous editions of the Games. China made its presence felt in the sporting world by dethroning Japan as the top medalists. In preparation for the IX Asian Games, color television was introduced in India in a big way, as the Games were to be broadcast in colour.

The logo of the games was the image of Misra Yantra, one of the four distinct astronomical instruments of the Jantar Mantar, New Delhi observatory.

The mascot for the Games was Appu – a kid elephant. Known in real life as "Kuttinarayanan", this elephant fractured its leg in an accident when he was seven years old – he stepped into a septic tank. That wound would not heal and it eventually killed him. Kuttinarayanan died on 14 May 2005.

Host of the next (10th) Asian Games in 1986, and the 24th Summer Olympics in 1988, Seoul, South Korea participated in the Delhi Asian Games with a 406-person delegation, including an observation team to study the facilities, management and events. Doordarshan started colour television broadcasts expressly for the Asian Games 1982.

It was officially opened by President Zail Singh and athlete's oath was taken by P.T. Usha. The main stadium for the games was the Jawaharlal Nehru Stadium.

Sports

 
 
 
 
 
 
 
 
 
 
 
 
 
 
 
 
 
 
 
 
 
 
 

Exhibition sports
 Kabaddi
 Sepak takraw

Participating nations

Medal table

The top ten ranked NOCs at these Games are listed below. The host nation, India, is highlighted.

China won Asian Games for the first time by defeating Japan in gold medal tally, and has become the defending winning team since.

See also
 Asian Games
 1951 Asian Games
 2010 Commonwealth Games

References

External links
IX Asian Games at Olympic Council of Asia website
Asian Games mascot Appu is no more
Celebrity elephant `Asiad Appu' died at the Aanakotta (elephant yard) of the Guruvayur Devaswom at Punnathurkotta

 
Asian Games
Asian Games
Asian Games
1980s in Delhi
Multi-sport events in India
Asian Games by year
Asian Games
International sports competitions hosted by India
November 1982 sports events in Asia
December 1982 sports events in Asia